The Trinidad and Tobago national football team, nicknamed the "Soca Warriors", represents the twin-island Republic of Trinidad and Tobago in international football. It is controlled by the Trinidad and Tobago Football Association, which is a member of CONCACAF (the Confederation of North, Central American and Caribbean Association Football), the Caribbean Football Union (CFU), and the global jurisdiction of FIFA.

The national team competes in the World Cup, Gold Cup, and the Nations League, as well as other competitions by invitation. The Soca Warriors lone appearance at the FIFA World Cup came in 2006, after the team defeated Bahrain 2–1 on aggregate in the CONCACAF–AFC intercontinental play-off. The team has qualified for the CONCACAF Gold Cup on 16 occasions with their best performance in 2000, after reaching the semi-finals, finishing third. However, the national team did experience great success at the defunct Caribbean Cup, having won the sub-continental competition ten times and runners-up on seven occasions.

The separate Trinidad and Tobago national football teams are not related to the national team and are not directly affiliated with the game's governing bodies of FIFA or CONCACAF, but are affiliated with the Trinidad and Tobago Football Association.

History

1970s
At the 1973 CONCACAF Championship, Trinidad and Tobago fell two points short of qualifying for the 1974 World Cup in controversial fashion. Trinidad and Tobago lost a crucial game on 4 December 1973 against hosts Haiti 2–1 after being denied five goals. The referee, José Roberto Henríquez of El Salvador, and Canadian linesman James Higuet were subsequently banned for life by FIFA for the dubious events of the match.

1980s to 1990s: The Strike Squad
Trinidad and Tobago came within one game of qualifying for the 1990 World Cup in Italy. Nicknamed the "Strike Squad" during the qualifying campaign, Trinidad and Tobago needed only a draw to qualify in their final game played at home against the United States on 19 November 1989. In front of an over-capacity crowd of more than 30,000 at the National Stadium on "Red Day", Paul Caligiuri of the United States scored the only goal of the game in the 38th minute dashing Trinidad and Tobago's qualification hopes. For the good behaviour of the crowd at the stadium, despite the devastating loss and overcrowded stands, the spectators of Trinidad and Tobago were awarded the FIFA Fair Play Award in 1989.

2000s

2006 FIFA World Cup

Trinidad and Tobago qualified for the 2006 World Cup in Germany, its first-ever qualification for the tournament. During their qualifying campaign, they sat at the bottom of the table in the final round of qualifying with one point from three. However, after the arrival of Leo Beenhakker as team coach and the recalling of veteran players Dwight Yorke and Russell Latapy, Trinidad and Tobago reversed its fortunes and placed fourth in the group. They qualified via a play-off against Bahrain, recovering from a 1–1 draw at home to win 1–0 in Manama, Bahrain to book a place in the finals. As a result, Trinidad and Tobago became the smallest country to qualify for the FIFA World Cup, a record they held until Iceland reached their first World Cup in 2018.

In Germany, Trinidad and Tobago were grouped with England, Sweden and Paraguay in Group B. They drew their first game 0–0 against Sweden despite going down to ten men early in the second half. They lost both their remaining matches against England and Paraguay by a 2–0 margin.

2010s

2010 World Cup Cycle

Trinidad and Tobago began their campaign in the second round against Bermuda. Trinidad and Tobago lost the first match 2–1 at home, but bounced back to win the away leg 2–0 to progress to the third round 3–2 on aggregate. The Soca Warriors entered Group 1 alongside the United States, Guatemala, and Cuba. They then progressed to the Hexagonal round, finishing second in the group with eleven points from six games. There they faced Costa Rica, El Salvador, Honduras, Mexico and the United States. The group began badly for Trinidad and Tobago as they drew 2–2 with El Salvador after leading 2–0, and then drew 1–1 with Honduras. Three consecutive losses, to the United States, Costa Rica and Mexico, put the Soca Warriors in last place with two points from five matches. After defeating El Salvador 1–0, they suffered further losses to Honduras and the United States the following month, ending their hopes of qualifying, and they eventually finished bottom of the group.

2014 World Cup Cycle

Trinidad and Tobago entered qualification for the 2014 World Cup in the second round as a seeded team, with Guyana, Bermuda and Barbados also drawn in Group B. The Soca Warriors defeated Bermuda (1–0) and Barbados (2–0) in their first two matches. However, on 7 October 2011, they lost away to Bermuda in Devonshire Parish 2–1. The team recovered  four days later by defeating Barbados 4–0 in the Hasely Crawford Stadium with a hat-trick from Lester Peltier. Entering the final two matches in the Second Round, Trinidad and Tobago were in second place, behind Guyana by one point. As only the group winners would advance to the third round, the Soca Warriors needed to take four points in the two matches against Guyana to advance. Trinidad and Tobago first traveled to Providence, Guyana to face the Golden Jaguars on 11 November 2011. With an early goal from Ricky Shakes and another from Leon Cort in the 81st minute, Trinidad and Tobago trailed 2–0 and faced elimination. Kenwyne Jones pull a goal back in the 93rd minute, but the match ended 2–1 to Guyana. On 12 January 2012, Otto Pfister was sacked after the country's earliest exit from World Cup qualification since 1994.

2018 World Cup Cycle

Trinidad and Tobago entered qualification for the 2018 FIFA World Cup in the fourth round and were drawn into Group C with Guatemala, Saint Vincent and the Grenadines, and the United States. The team finished second in the group with 11 points to qualify for the Hexagonal. However, they finished in sixth place in the final round with only six points, even though they eliminated the United States from World Cup contention with a 2–1 victory in the final match.

Team image

Home stadium

For the first eighty years of their existence, Trinidad and Tobago played their home matches all around the country with Queen's Park Oval, generally thought of as the most picturesque and largest of the old cricket grounds in the West Indies, as the most often used venue. The cricket ground served as the country's largest stadium until the new National Stadium was built in Mucurapo, Port of Spain, to host the nation's athletics competitions and international football matches.

The stadium later was renovated and renamed after Hasely Crawford, the first person from Trinidad and Tobago to win an Olympic gold medal, prior to Trinidad and Tobago hosting the 2001 FIFA U-17 World Championship. The stadium currently has a seating capacity of 23,000 and is owned by the Trinidad and Tobago government and managed through the Ministry of Sport via its special purpose state agency called SporTT.

In recent years, the TTFA have hosted matches at the smaller 10,000 seat Ato Boldon Stadium in Couva, citing a problem with the lighting system at Hasely Crawford Stadium, lower expenses for matches at Ato Boldon, and fans being seated closer to the pitch.  Trinidad and Tobago hosted two games during "The Hex" in late 2017. They lost to Honduras 1–2 on 1 September 2017. On 10 October 2017, Trinidad and Tobago defeated the United States 2–1, causing the United States to fail to qualify for the World Cup for the first time since 1986. Ato Boldon Stadium has since hosted friendlies against Grenada, Guyana, and Panama.

Supporters

The major supporters' group for the national team is the Soca Warriors Supporters Club or the "Warrior Nation". The group is a non-profit organisation that is independent of the Trinidad and Tobago Football Association. Formed shortly after Trinidad and Tobago secured qualification for the 2006 FIFA World Cup, the supporters' club was organised by Soca Warriors Online founder Inshan Mohammed and Nigel Myers.

The group's activities include promoting teams locally and globally, lobbying the Trinidad and Tobago Football Association as representatives of football fans, advocating fair pricing and allocation of event tickets, organising travel for fans to home and away matches, providing a family-oriented fans' organisation, and promoting football among the young people of Trinidad and Tobago.

Schedule and results
The following is a list of match results in the last 12 months, as well as any future matches that have been scheduled.

2022

2023

Coaching staff

Managers

Players
For all past and present players who have appeared for the national team, see Trinidad and Tobago national team players.

Current squad
 The following players were called up for the 2022 King's Cup.
 Match dates: 22 and 25 September 2022
 Opposition:  and Caps and goals correct as of: 13 June 2022, after the match against 

Recent call-ups
The following players have been called to the squad in the last twelve months.

Records

Players in bold are still active with Trinidad and Tobago.

Most capped players

Top goalscorers

Competitive record

FIFA World Cup

Trinidad and Tobago first appeared at the 2006 FIFA World Cup. The Soca Warriors finished bottom of the group with one point from the team's three matches. Even though the team did not advance in the competition, Trinidad and Tobago recorded its first point from the FIFA World Cup after a 0–0 draw to Sweden in its first match.

Trinidad and Tobago failed to qualify for the FIFA World Cup between 1966 and 2002, then again from 2010 to 2022.

CONCACAF Gold Cup

CONCACAF Championship 1963–1989, CONCACAF Gold Cup 1991–present

CONCACAF Nations League

Caribbean Cup

Honours
Major competitionsCONCACAF Championship & Gold Cup Runners-up (1): 1973
 Third place (2): 1989, 2000
Minor competitionsCFU Championship & Caribbean Cup Champions (10): 1981, 1988, 1989, 1992, 1994, 1995, 1996, 1997, 1999, 2001
 Runners-up (7): 1978, 1983, 1991, 1998, 2007, 2012, 2014
 Third place (2): 1993, 2005OSN Cup Third place (1): 2013

Friendly competitionsCoupe Duvalier Third place: 1966

FIFA World Ranking

Last update was on 23 December 2021
Source:

 Best Ranking   Worst Ranking   Best Mover   Worst Mover'''

See also

 TT Pro League (top league in Trinidad and Tobago)
 Trinidad and Tobago men's national under-20 football team
 Trinidad and Tobago men's national under-17 football team
 Trinidad and Tobago women's national football team
 Football in Trinidad and Tobago

Notes

References
General
 Trinidad and Tobago Football History

Specific

External links

 Trinidad and Tobago Football Association
 Soca Warriors Online – National Team
 Trinidad and Tobago FIFA profile

 
Football in Trinidad and Tobago
Caribbean national association football teams